The following active airports serve the area around Fort McMurray, Alberta, Canada:

See also

 List of airports in the Calgary area
 List of airports in the Edmonton Metropolitan Region
 List of airports in the Lethbridge area
 List of airports in the Red Deer area

References

 
Airports Fort McMurray
 
Fort McMurray
Fort McMurray